The 2010 United States Senate special election in Delaware took place on November 2, 2010, concurrently with elections to the United States Senate in other states as well as elections to the United States House of Representatives and various state and local elections. It was a special election to fill Delaware's Class II Senate seat, then held by Democrat Ted Kaufman, an appointee. The seat had been previously held by the state's longest-serving senator, Democrat Joe Biden, who vacated it when he became Vice President of the United States in 2009.

The state's primary election occurred on September 14, 2010. Republican U.S. Representative and former Governor Mike Castle was favored to win both the primary and the general election, but was upset by Christine O'Donnell in a primary contest that had national visibility. During the general election campaign, O'Donnell, a Tea Party candidate, drew media attention for a campaign ad that featured her denying that she was a witch. In the general election, O'Donnell lost to Democratic New Castle County Executive Chris Coons by a vote of 57% to 40%. Coons immediately took office after the results were certified, and completed the remainder of the term lasting to January 2015.  This was the first open Senate seat in Delaware since 1970 and the first in this seat since 1913.

Background 
In the seat's most recent election in 2008, longtime Democratic incumbent Joe Biden defeated Republican Christine O'Donnell. However, Biden was also elected Vice President of the United States in 2008 and was required to resign from the Senate by Article I, Section 6 of the United States Constitution in order to assume the Vice Presidency. Although Biden was sworn in for a seventh term early in January 2009, he resigned from the Senate on January 15, 2009, and was succeeded by Kaufman the following day.

Those discussed as possible appointees to replace Biden included Delaware Attorney General Beau Biden, a son of Joe Biden; outgoing Lt. Gov. John Carney, Delaware Supreme Court Chief Justice Myron T. Steele, Delaware Secretary of State Harriet Smith Windsor, Delaware Correction Commissioner Carl C. Danberg, former Delaware House of Representatives member Robert L. Byrd, and New Castle County Executive Chris Coons.

On November 24, 2008, after Biden's election to the vice presidency but before his resignation, outgoing Governor Ruth Ann Minner announced that she would appoint Biden's former chief of staff, a member of the Broadcasting Board of Governors named Ted Kaufman, as Biden's temporary successor.  Minner said, "I believe Ted Kaufman meets every test I set for this office. His political views are close to Sen. Biden's, and he has agreed to focus solely on doing the people's work, not seeking re-election." Biden resigned in January 2009; Minner formally appointed Kaufman to the seat shortly thereafter.

Republican primary

Candidates 
 Mike Castle, U.S. Representative, former Governor of Delaware and former Lieutenant Governor of Delaware
 Christine O'Donnell, political commentator and perennial candidate

Campaign 
In April 2009, U.S. Rep. Mike Castle stated "there's probably a better chance I'll run for the Senate than the House. [But] I said there's a chance I won't run at all."  On October 6, 2009, Castle announced that he would in fact run for the Senate seat.  After the 2008 election loss to incumbent Democrat Joe Biden, Christine O'Donnell had indicated she would strongly consider running for the seat again in 2010, asking supporters on her web site to "save your yard sign!!" On February 12, 2009, O'Donnell had announced her candidacy.  She reiterated that she was in the race even after Michael Castle announced his candidacy in October 2009, and formally launched her campaign on March 10, 2010.  In her remarks, O'Donnell criticized excessive government spending, said that Castle was the most liberal Republican in the House, and said that the Tea Party movement and grassroots anti-incumbent trends would be in her favor.

When a report from The News Journal in March 2010 detailed O'Donnell's fiscal difficulties, she attributed the problems to misunderstandings and errors, and said, "I think the fact that I have struggled financially is what makes me so sympathetic."  Nevertheless, her financial problems became a focal point of establishment Republican attacks against her.
A July 2010 Rasmussen Reports poll showed O'Donnell running ahead of Democratic Senate candidate Chris Coons by a margin of 41 to 39 percent in a hypothetical matchup. During this time she picked up the endorsements of the Susan B. Anthony List, the Tea Party Express, which called her a "strong voice for conservative constitutionalist principles", and the Family Research Council.

O'Donnell supporters were heartened by the late August primary victory in Alaska of little-known, Tea Party-backed insurgent Joe Miller over incumbent Republican Senator Lisa Murkowski. The Tea Party Express said it might spend as much as $600,000 backing O'Donnell.  The added 'buzz' about her campaign and the possibility that another establishment Republican figure might be defeated by an insurgent brought national attention to the race.  The same attention also brought additional scrutiny on her record and financial history, including a contentious interview on WGMD radio. She had claimed that she beat or tied Joe Biden in two of the state's three counties in their 2008 campaign. Later, she admitted this was inaccurate, and that she had lost all three counties.

As September began, the nastiness of the tone of the race had increased, with Delaware Republican Party chair Tom Ross saying, "Is Christine O'Donnell actually this unhinged from reality? Or is she simply a liar, whose total lack of respect for Delaware voters leads her to deliberately and repeatedly deny the clear facts surrounding her many personal and professional failures?"
Ross also said, "She's not a viable candidate for any office in the state of Delaware. She could not be elected dog catcher."

The O'Donnell campaign generated some controversy in early September when a political consulting firm hired by O'Donnell released a Web video insinuating that her opponent, Mike Castle, was having a gay affair.  O'Donnell quickly distanced herself from the claims, pointing out that the firm in question was no longer working for her campaign, though the manner in which she denied involvement in the rumor led some to suspect that she was intentionally engaging in a whisper campaign by deliberately repeating the rumor while denying it.  O'Donnell later appeared on Mark Levin's radio show, where she blasted Castle's "unmanly tactics" during the campaign, saying, "this is not a bake-off, put your man-pants on."

Kristen Murray, O'Donnell's 2008 campaign manager, starred in a Delaware Republican Party-funded robocall in which she accused O'Donnell of misusing campaign funds. Says Murray, "This is her third senate race in five years. As O'Donnell's manager, I found out she was living on campaign donations - using them for rent and personal expenses, while leaving her workers unpaid and piling up thousands in debt. She wasn't concerned about conservative causes. O'Donnell just wanted to make a buck."
O'Donnell denied most of what Murray said and stated that she had fired Murray.

With days to go before the primary, O'Donnell was bolstered by an endorsement from former Governor of Alaska and Republican vice-presidential nominee Sarah Palin. A few days later, The Weekly Standard broke new details of O'Donnell's 2005 $6.95 million gender discrimination and wrongful termination lawsuit against her former employer, the conservative Intercollegiate Studies Institute.

Castle was considered the favorite to prevail in the general election. Polls that considered a matchup of Castle against Democrat Chris Coons indicated that Castle would defeat Coons by a significant margin. In September, a poll by Public Policy Polling showed Castle leading Coons by a 10-point margin.

On September 14, 2010, O'Donnell won an upset victory over Castle in the Republican primary. Politico reported, "The path to a Republican Senate takeover narrowed to the point of vanishing Tuesday night, as marketing consultant Christine O’Donnell upset Rep. Mike Castle in Delaware’s Senate primary and likely dashed the GOP’s hopes of capturing the seat in the process".

Polling

Results

General election

Candidates 

 Chris Coons (D)
 Christine O'Donnell (R)
 Glenn Miller (I)
 James Rash (L)

Campaign 
Incumbent U.S. Senator Ted Kaufman opted not to seek election to the Senate in 2010. Former Lieutenant Governor John Carney and State Attorney General Beau Biden, both Democrats, opted not to seek the Senate seat, either. New Castle County Executive Chris Coons became the Democratic Party's U.S. Senate nominee; he did not face a primary challenge.

Following her upset victory in the Republican primary, Christine O'Donnell continued to face a split reaction from the leaders in the local, state, and national Republican Party.
Castle said he would not support O'Donnell.
The National Republican Senatorial Committee similarly released a statement almost immediately following O'Donnell's primary win, stating that they would not spend money to support her or her campaign.  However, Texas Senator John Cornyn, chairman of the NRSC, released a statement later stating he did not know where the release from within his organization originated.  He then offered the maximum $42,000 donation to her campaign; Cornyn acknowledged, however, that he was not sure if she could win.  Former Governor of Massachusetts and 2012 presidential candidate Mitt Romney also contributed to O'Donnell's general election funds.  However, former White House adviser and Republican strategist Karl Rove said following O'Donnell's victory, "This is not a race we're going to be able to win."

The morning following the primary, Public Policy Polling released a tweet indicating that their polling found that primary voters who voted for Mike Castle supported Coons, the Democratic opponent, over O'Donnell 44 percent to 28 percent in a general election. An October 16 report by CNN indicated that Coons was leading O'Donnell by double digits in polls.

In September 2010, comedian Bill Maher aired a 1999 clip of O'Donnell in which O'Donnell said, "I dabbled into witchcraft – I never joined a coven. ... I hung around people who were doing these things... We went to a movie and then had a little midnight picnic on a satanic altar. And I didn't know it." Her admission received widespread media coverage, and O'Donnell explained that she had been referring to high school experiences. During her campaign for the general election, O'Donnell followed up with a TV advertisement which featured her declaring, "I'm not a witch". This ad inspired many video parodies, most famously by comedian Kristen Wiig on Saturday Night Live.

An October 19, 2010, debate between Coons and O'Donnell at Widener University School of Law featured an exchange about separation of church and state in the United States and whether it is explicitly in the U.S. constitution.  O'Donnell said it was not; afterward her campaign manager said, "Christine O'Donnell was not questioning the concept of separation of church and state as subsequently established by the courts. She simply made the point that the phrase appears nowhere in the Constitution." (That phrase was "substantively" read into the First Amendment in the U.S. Supreme Court case Engel v. Vitale in 1962 and does not appear verbatim in the Constitution.)

Fundraising

Predictions

Polling

Results

Aftermath 
After O'Donnell's poor performance, there was considerable discussion within Republican circles regarding whether the party had lost a sure Senate seat by nominating her instead of Castle. Party pragmatists said that this had happened, and pointed to other races in Nevada and Colorado where Tea Party-favored candidates had lost races against Democratic rivals. Party purists dismissed this concern, and said that running candidates who supported fundamentally conservative values was always worthwhile. For her own part, O'Donnell criticized divisions within the Delaware Republican Party following her primary win and said the consequent lack of support had led to her defeat.

References

External links 
 Delaware Commissioner of Elections
 Official candidate listings
 U.S. Congress candidates for Delaware at Project Vote Smart
 Delaware U.S. Senate - Special Election from OurCampaigns.com
 Campaign contributions from Open Secrets
 2010 Delaware Senate General Election: Christine O'Donnell (R) vs. Chris Coons (D) graph of multiple polls from Pollster.com
 Election 2010: Delaware Senate from Rasmussen Reports
 Delaware Senate - Castle vs. Biden from Real Clear Politics
 2010 Delaware Senate Race from CQ Politics
 Race profile from The New York Times
 Election 2010 at The News Journal
Official candidate websites (Archived)
 Mike Castle for U.S. Senate
 Chris Coons for U.S. Senate
 Christine O'Donnell for U.S. Senate
 Delawareans for Miller for U.S. Senate

Senate
Delaware
2010
Delaware 2010
Delaware Senate (Class II)
United States Senate 2010